Noodasjärv is a lake in Estonia's Voru County.

See also
List of lakes of Estonia

Lakes of Estonia
Võru Parish
Lakes of Võru County